Heather Elizabeth Morris (born February 1, 1987) is an American actress, dancer, singer, and model. She played the role of Brittany S. Pierce in the Fox musical comedy-drama series Glee.

Early life
Morris was born in Thousand Oaks, California, and raised in Scottsdale, Arizona. She began dancing in early childhood. Morris competed at a young age in a variety of styles including jazz, tap, and contemporary. Her father died of cancer when she was 14 years old. After graduating from Desert Mountain High School, where she was homecoming queen, Morris spent a year at Arizona State University before moving to Los Angeles to pursue a dance career.

Career
Morris' first significant appearance was in 2006 on So You Think You Can Dance Season 2 where she made it through "Vegas Week" without being cut, but failed to make the final 20 by a vote of 3 to 2.

Not discouraged, Morris actively pursued a career in dancing. Her big break came in 2007 via Beyoncé. Morris was one of Beyoncé's backup dancers on The Beyoncé Experience world tour and, following that, worked again with Beyoncé on a mini "Single Ladies (Put a Ring on It)" promotional tour that included 2008 performances on the American Music Awards, Saturday Night Live, The Ellen DeGeneres Show, Today, and MTV's Total Request Live finale. She also danced backup for Beyoncé and Tina Turner at the 50th Annual Grammy Awards in 2008. She later appeared in a small role in the movie Fired Up, where she met choreographer Zach Woodlee. Following that film, Woodlee brought Morris in to dance on other shows he was choreographing, including episodes of Eli Stone and Swingtown, and the movie Bedtime Stories; eventually, Morris landed a role as Brittany on Glee.

In December 2010, Morris was named the Celebrity Style Ambassador for FLIRT! Cosmetics, an Estee Lauder cosmetics line. In 2010, Morris made the Maxim Hot 100 list, coming in at number 85. On the AfterEllen hot 100 list, she was ranked #2 behind her close friend Naya Rivera.

In 2011, Morris starred in a back-to-school commercial for Staples Canada that featured her dancing.

In the October 2011 issue of Fitness magazine, she stated that she had her breast implants removed. "Implants were something I thought I wanted when I was younger, and now I don't. It was hard being active with them, because my chest was always sore. It hurt a lot, and I didn't like always being in pain, so they had to go!" Her breast implant surgery was done sometime between her time on So You Think You Can Dance at age 18, and age 21 when she was a backup dancer for Beyoncé.

Glee
Morris was taking acting classes and actively pursuing an acting career when she was asked by Woodlee to teach the choreography for Beyoncé's "Single Ladies" dance to the Glee actors. At the same time, the show was looking for a third cheerleader, and Morris ended up landing the role of Brittany. Initially a background character who hardly ever spoke, the role grew as writers discovered Morris had a gift for delivering one-liners. Jarrett Wieselman of the New York Post opined that Morris had "emerged as one of the funniest second bananas on TV right now" and a LA Times writer mentioned having a "comedy crush on Morris, who plays the galactically dim Glee Club cheerleader Brittany".

When a promotional clip for the episode "Sectionals" indicated that Brittany Pierce and Santana Lopez had slept together, Dorothy Snarker, writing for lesbian entertainment website After Ellen, praised the pairing, referring to them by the portmanteau "Brittana". Snarker called the two her "new favorite Glee pairing", commenting that: "While Heather Morris (Brittany) and Naya Rivera (Santana) have had minimal screen time, they've made it count. Heather in particular has brought the laughs as the Cheerio least likely to get a Mensa invitation. Never mind Finn and Rachel — I'm on Team Brittana now."

Morris' role became more prominent during the final nine episodes of season one and, due to the overwhelmingly positive response to her character, was promoted to official series regular status during season two. She was at the center of the second episode, "Britney/Brittany" (a tribute to Britney Spears), where she made her singing debut covering Spears' "I'm a Slave 4 U" solo and dueting with Naya Rivera on "Me Against the Music". She later got many other singing and dancing solos. The second half of season two saw Morris' character engage in a lesbian storyline with Rivera's character. The arc and Rivera's and Morris' performances were met with critical acclaim. As on Glee, Morris was best friends in real life with co-star Rivera, until Rivera’s death in 2020.

In Season 3, her and Rivera's characters continue with the lesbian storyline. Morris had a large role in the episode "Prom-asaurus". During the season finale, she reveals that she has an 0.0 GPA and that she will not be graduating.

During the 2011 Glee Tour, Morris performed Britney Spears' song "I'm a Slave 4 U". She also had a dance spotlight with castmate Harry Shum Jr. during Naya Rivera's performance of "Valerie", and was one of the dancers in the "Single Ladies" and "Safety Dance" numbers.

Morris co-wrote and appeared in a January 2011 video for the comedy website Funny or Die, "Nuthin' But A Glee Thang" a parody of "Nuthin' but a 'G' Thang" by Dr. Dre featuring Snoop Dogg. Co-written with actresses Ashley Lendzion and Riki Lindhome, the video features appearances from Modern Family'''s Sofia Vergara and Morris' Glee castmates Matthew Morrison, Cory Monteith, Harry Shum Jr., and Naya Rivera.

On June 28, 2013, it was reported that Morris would not be returning as a regular on Glee fifth season. However, Morris reprised her role for the show's hundredth episode and the final episode of the show's fifth season. Morris also appeared in five episodes in the show's sixth and final season, including the series finale.

Dancing with the Stars, The Masked Dancer
On March 1, 2017, Morris was revealed as one of the contestants who would compete on season 24 of Dancing with the Stars. Her participation in the show has been criticized, with many citing her professional dancing experience as an unfair advantage. The producers defended their decision to cast Morris by saying that she doesn't have ballroom or partnering experience. She was paired with professional dancer Maksim Chmerkovskiy, though she danced with troupe member Alan Bersten starting on the second until the fifth week of the competition due to Chmerkovskiy suffering a calf muscle injury. Morris and Chmerkovskiy reunited to dance in the sixth week of the competition on April 24, 2017, but were eliminated despite receiving the first perfect score of the season and topping the results board.

On October 22, 2022, Morris was revealed to be the winner of the second season of The Masked Dancer. She participated in the show under the character of "Scissors".

Personal life
Morris is married to Taylor Hubbell, whom she began dating when he was a college baseball player. They attended the same high school in Arizona, but did not know each other there. They began dating after Morris moved to Los Angeles and Hubbell contacted her on Myspace. In a 2011 interview with Fitness'', Morris said of Hubbell, "I want to marry him so bad. That's what I really care about. I want to marry Taylor and have kids with him. I love acting, but if it affects my relationship, then I won't continue doing it." After graduating from the University of Louisiana in Lafayette, Hubbell began living with Morris in Los Angeles in early 2012. Morris gave birth to their first child, a son, on September 28, 2013, and he was named after Taylor Hubbell's older cousin. On August 28, 2014, it was announced that she and Hubbell were engaged, and they married on May 16, 2015. In August 2015, she announced via social media that they were expecting their second child. In an interview with E! News, she revealed that the second child would be a boy. She gave birth to their second son on February 11, 2016.

Filmography

Film

Television

Music videos

Awards and nominations

Discography

References

External links

 

1987 births
21st-century American actresses
21st-century American singers
21st-century American women singers
Actresses from California
Actresses from Scottsdale, Arizona
American female dancers
American female models
American film actresses
American television actresses
American voice actresses
Dancers from California
Female models from California
Living people
Musicians from Scottsdale, Arizona
People from Thousand Oaks, California
Singers from Arizona
Singers from California
So You Think You Can Dance (American TV series) contestants